The spotted tody-flycatcher (Todirostrum maculatum) is a species of bird in the family Tyrannidae, the tyrant flycatchers.
It is found in Bolivia, Brazil, Colombia, Ecuador, French Guiana, Guyana, Peru, Suriname, Trinidad and Tobago, and Venezuela, and is mostly a species of the Amazon Basin countries and Guianan countries.

Its natural habitats are subtropical or tropical moist lowland forests, subtropical or tropical mangrove forests, subtropical or tropical moist shrubland, and heavily degraded former forest.

The spotted tody-flycatcher is a bird of the Amazon Basin and in the east the neighboring Araguaia River of the Araguaia-Tocantins River drainage. It ranges on the Caribbean coast into eastern Venezuela and the Guianas. Its range is mostly absent in the northeast Amazon Basin, which is known as the Guiana Shield region, where its sister species, the painted tody-flycatcher, has the center of its range.

References

External links
Spotted tody-flycatcher photo gallery VIREO Photo-High Res
Photo-High Res; Article oiseaux
Photo-High Res; Article https://www.nhlstenden.com/;"Suriname Birds"-(with Map)

spotted tody-flycatcher
Birds of the Amazon Basin
Birds of the Guianas
Birds of Trinidad and Tobago
spotted tody-flycatcher
Birds of Brazil
Taxonomy articles created by Polbot